Haddada may refer to,

Algeria
Haddada District, part of Souk Ahras Province, Algeria
Haddada, Algeria, a town or commune located in Haddada District
Haddada, Boumerdès, a village located in Thenia District

Morocco
Haddada, Morocco